Events from the year 1801 in Sweden

Incumbents
 Monarch – Gustav IV Adolf

Events

 The Swedish colony of Saint Barthélemy is occupied by Great Britain.
 Carl Gustaf af Leopold publishes the Afhandling om svenska stafsättet
 Foundation of the Djurgårdsteatern in Stockholm, the only theater except the Royal Dramatic Theater allowed to function in the capital during the 1798-1842 royal theater monopoly.

Births
 22 January – Lars Johan Hierta,  newspaper publisher, social critic, businessman and politician  (died 1872)
 1 February - Adolf Fredrik Lindblad, composer (died 1878)
 24 March - Immanuel Nobel, engineer, architect, inventor and industrialist (died 1872)
 9 May – Ulrika von Strussenfelt, writer (died 1873)
 17 May - Lovisa Åhrberg, herbalist doctor (died 1881)
 21 May - Princess Sophie of Sweden, princess (died 1865)
 26 July – Maria Röhl, portrait artist (died 1875)
 14 August - Fredrika Bremer, writer  (died 1865)
 22 October - Carl Jacob Sundevall, zoologist (died 1875)
 18 December – Ulrik Torsslow, actor (died 1881)
 Brita Sofia Hesselius, photographer (died 1866)

Deaths

 Ulrica Arfvidsson, fortune teller  (born 1734)

References

 
Years of the 19th century in Sweden
Sweden